BSA may refer to:

Businesses and organizations

 Basketball South Africa
 Bearing Specialists Association
 Belarusian Socialist Assembly
 Bibliographical Society of America
 Birmingham Small Arms Company, UK manufacturer of firearms and vehicles
 Black Socialists in America
 Boston Society of Architects
 Botanical Society of America
 Boy Scouts of America
Scouts BSA, the flagship program
 British Social Attitudes Survey
 British Sandwich Association
 British Science Association
 British Sociological Association
 British Speleological Association
 British Stammering Association
 Broadcasting Service Association, former name of the Australian radio network Macquarie Media
 Broadcasting Standards Authority
 BSA Company, motorcycle manufacturer
 BSA motorcycles, made by the Birmingham Small Arms Company Limited
 BSA (The Software Alliance), a trade group established by Microsoft, formerly called Business Software Alliance
 BSA Manufacturing, a Malaysian manufacturer of aluminum alloy wheels
 Business Services Association, of UK service providers

Schools
 Baltimore School for the Arts
 Birmingham School of Acting
 British School at Athens

Science and medicine
 Behavioral systems analysis
 Bis(trimethylsilyl)acetamide
 Body surface area
 Bovine serum albumin
 Broad-spectrum antiviral drug

Other uses
 Bank Secrecy Act, US
 Bilateral Security Agreement, US umbrella for military cooperation
 Bosnian Serb Army, the Army of Republika Srpska, the former armed forces of the Republika Srpska
 Bachelor of Science and Arts (BSA)
 Bachelor of Science in Accountancy (BSA)
 Bachelor of Science in Agriculture (B.S.A.)
 British Soap Awards, an awards ceremony in the UK
 BSA, a brand of bicycles produced by Tube Investments of India
 Business systems analyst
 Blue Dragon Series Awards, an annual award ceremony in South Korea

See also